The 23rd District of the Iowa Senate is located in central Iowa, and is currently composed of Story County.

Current elected officials
Herman Quirmbach is the senator currently representing the 23rd District.

The area of the 23rd District contains two Iowa House of Representatives districts:
The 45th District (represented by Beth Wessel-Kroeschell)
The 46th District (represented by Ross Wilburn)

The district is also located in Iowa's 3rd congressional district, which is represented by Cindy Axne.

Past senators
The district has previously been represented by:

Arthur Small, 1983–1986
Jean Lloyd-Jones, 1987–1994
Mary Neuhauser, 1995–1998
Joe Bolkcom, 1999–2002
Herman Quirmbach, 2003–present

See also
Iowa General Assembly
Iowa Senate

References

23